The 1974 United States Senate election in Nevada was held on November 5, 1974. Incumbent Democratic U.S. Senator Alan Bible decided to retire instead of seeking a fourth full term. Republican nominee Paul Laxalt won the open seat.

Paul Laxalt, former Governor (1967–1971) and former Lieutenant Governor of Nevada (1963–1967), won by less than 700 votes, becoming one of the few bright spots in a bad year for Republicans. This was the only seat that flipped from Democratic to Republican. He beat Harry Reid, Lieutenant Governor of Nevada since 1971 and former State Assemblyman (1968–1970).

Bible resigned three weeks early (on December 17, 1974) and on one day later Nevada Democratic Governor Mike O'Callaghan appointed Laxalt to finish out that term. When Laxalt retired in 1986, Harry Reid won the seat that he lost in this election.

See also 
 United States Senate elections, 1974 and 1975

References

Nevada
1974
United States Senate